The Mojo Awards (or Mojo Honours Lists) was an awards ceremony that began in 2004 and ended in 2009 by Mojo, a popular music magazine published monthly by Bauer in the United Kingdom. The awards featured a mixture of readers' and critics' awards.

2010 Honourees
List of 2010 Mojo Awards Winners:

Best Breakthrough Act: The Low Anthem
 The Jim Jones Revue
 John Grant
 Florence and the Machine
 Mumford & Sons
Best Album: Richard Hawley, Truelove's Gutter
 Kasabian, West Ryder Pauper Lunatic Asylum
 Joanna Newsom, Have One on Me
 Florence and the Machine, Lungs
 Paul Weller, Wake Up the Nation
 Song of the Year: Kasabian, Fire
 Richard Hawley, "Open Up Your Door"
 Florence and the Machine, "You've Got the Love"
 Arctic Monkeys, "Crying Lightning"
 Rage Against the Machine, "Killing in the Name"
 Best Live Act: Midlake
 Kasabian
 Florence and the Machine
 Rufus Wainwright
 Arctic Monkeys
 Best Compilation Award: The Future Sound of London

Achievement Award
 Catalogue Release of the Year – The Beatles Remastered
 Mojo Medal – Mute's Daniel Miller
 Classic Songwriter – Roy Wood
 Hall of Fame – Jimmy Page
 Les Paul Award – Richard Thompson
 Lifetime Achievement Award – Jean-Michel Jarre
 Inspiration Award – The Teardrop Explodes
 Best Classic Album Award – The Stone Roses
 Vision Award – Oil City Confidential
 Maverick Award – Hawkwind
 Hero Award – Marc Almond
 Icon Award – Duane Eddy
 Outstanding Contribution to Music Award – Sigur Rós
 Roots Award – Kate & Anna McGarrigle

2009 Honourees
List of 2009 Mojo Awards Winners:

 Best Breakthrough Act: White Lies
 Gallows
 Eli "Paperboy" Reed
 School of Seven Bells
 Glasvegas
 Best Album: Paul Weller, 22 Dreams
 Fleet Foxes, Fleet Foxes
 Kings of Leon, Only by the Night
 Elbow, The Seldom Seen Kid
 PJ Harvey & John Parish, A Woman a Man Walked By
 Best Live Act: Fleet Foxes
 Paul Weller
 Leonard Cohen
 Seasick Steve
 Radiohead
 Song of the Year: Elbow, "One Day Like This"
 Fleet Foxes, "White Winter Hymnal"
 Kings of Leon, "Sex on Fire"
 Franz Ferdinand, "Ulysses"
 Animal Collective, "My Girls"
 Best Compilation Award: Take Me to the River: A Southern Soul Story 1961–1977

Achievement Award
 Inspiration Award – Blur
 Best Classic Album Award – The Zombies – Odessey and Oracle
 Vision Award – Joy Division
 Maverick Award – Manic Street Preachers
 Hero Award – The Pretty Things
 Icon Award – Phil Lynott
 Outstanding Contribution to Music Award – Joe Brown
 Roots Award – Topic Records
 Catalogue Release of the Year – Miles Davis
 Mojo Medal – Chris Blackwell/Island Records
 Classic Songwriter – Johnny Marr
 Hall of Fame – Mott the Hoople
 Les Paul Award – Billy Gibbons
 Lifetime Achievement Award – Yoko Ono

2008 Honourees
List of 2008 Mojo Awards winners:

Song of the Year – "Mercy" by Duffy
Best Live Act – Led Zeppelin
Best Breakthrough Act – The Last Shadow Puppets
Best Album Award – Dig, Lazarus, Dig! (Nick Cave & the Bad Seeds)

Outstanding Contribution to Music – Paul Weller
Icon Award – Sex Pistols
Classic Songwriter – Neil Diamond
Hero Award – Motörhead
Hall of Fame – The Specials
Lifetime Achievement Award – Genesis
Special Award – Judy Collins
Legend Award – Irma Thomas
Classic Album Award – My Bloody Valentine for Loveless
Inspiration Award – John Fogerty
Roots Award – Toots Hibbert
Les Paul Award – John Martyn
Maverick Award – Mark E. Smith
Vision Award – Julien Temple for The Future is Unwritten
Compilation of the Year – Juno Original Soundtrack
Catalogue Release of the Year – Pillows & Prayers

2007 Honourees
List of 2007 Mojo Awards winners:

Album of the Year – The Good, the Bad & the Queen
Song of the Year – "Rehab" by Amy Winehouse
Best Live Act – Arcade Fire
Breakthrough Act – Seasick Steve

Catalogue Release – The Complete Motown Singles: Volume 6
Classic Album Award – Exodus by Bob Marley
Compilation – White Bicycles - Making Music in the 1960s
Cult Hero – The Only Ones
Hall of Fame Award – The Doors
Hero Award – Alice Cooper
Icon Award – Ozzy Osbourne
Innovation in Sound Award – Suicide
Inspiration Award – Björk
Legend Award – Ike Turner
Les Paul Award – Peter Green
Lifetime Achievement Award – The Stooges
Maverick Award – Echo & the Bunnymen
The Mojo Medal – Jac Holzman of Elektra Records
Outstanding Contribution – Joy Division
Vision Award – Slade in Flame

2006 Honourees
List of 2006 Mojo Awards winners:

Best New Act – Corinne Bailey Rae
Catalogue Release – Johnny Cash – The Legend
Classic Album Award – Tago Mago by Can
Hall of Fame Award – Elton John
Hero Award – Prince Buster
Icon Award – Scott Walker
Inspiration Award – Buzzcocks
Les Paul Award – Brian May

Lifetime Achievement Award – David Gilmour
Maverick Award – The Jesus & Mary Chain
The Mojo Medal – Jools Holland
Merit Award – Bert Jansch
Roots Award – Dan Penn & Spooner Oldham
Songwriter Award – Chrissie Hynde
Vision Award – Flaming Lips – Fearless Freaks

2005 Honourees
List of 2005 Mojo Awards winners:

Best New Act – The Magic Numbers
Catalogue Release – The Fall: Complete Peel Sessions
Classic Album Award – Rum, Sodomy, and the Lash (The Pogues)
Hall of Fame Award – Madness
Hero Award – Roy Harper
Icon Award – Siouxsie Sioux
Image Award – Jim Marshall
Inspiration Award – Gang of Four

Legend Award – Dr. John
Les Paul Award – Jeff Beck
Lifetime Achievement Award – Robert Wyatt
Maverick Award – Steve Earle
The Mojo Medal – Chess Records
Roots Award – Chris Hillman
Songwriter Award – Paul Weller
Vision Award – Martin Scorsese Presents the Blues

2004 Honourees
List of 2004 Mojo Awards winners:

Catalogue Release – Muzik City, The Trojan Records Story
Classic Album Award – Marquee Moon by Television
Hall of Fame Award – Arthur Lee
Hero Award – Roger McGuinn
Icon Award – Morrissey
Image Award – Bob Gruen
Inspiration Award – The Clash
Lifetime Achievement Award – James Brown

Maestro Award – Jimmy Page
Maverick Award – Red Hot Chili Peppers
The Mojo Medal – Geoff Travis of Rough Trade Records
Mondial Award – Sting
Songwriter Award – Ray Davies
Special Award – The Shadows
Vision Award – Led Zeppelin DVD

References

External links
Mojo magazine official site

British music awards
Awards established in 2004